Homestead Valley is a census-designated place in San Bernardino County, California. The 2010 United States census reported Homestead Valley's population was 3,032.

Geography
According to the United States Census Bureau, the CDP covers an area of 33.9 square miles (87.8 km), all of it land.

Demographics
At the 2010 census Homestead Valley had a population of 3,032. The racial makeup of Homestead Valley was 2,594 (85.6%) White (76.8% Non-Hispanic White), 34 (1.1%) African American, 58 (1.9%) Native American, 30 (1.0%) Asian, 9 (0.3%) Pacific Islander, 196 (6.5%) from other races, and 111 (3.7%) from two or more races. Hispanic or Latino of any race were 517 people (17.1%).

The whole population lived in households, no one lived in non-institutionalized group quarters and no one was institutionalized.

There were 1,389 households, 270 (19.4%) had children under the age of 18 living in them, 531 (38.2%) were opposite-sex married couples living together, 131 (9.4%) had a female householder with no husband present, 88 (6.3%) had a male householder with no wife present.  There were 85 (6.1%) unmarried opposite-sex partnerships, and 16 (1.2%) same-sex married couples or partnerships. 538 households (38.7%) were one person and 221 (15.9%) had someone living alone who was 65 or older. The average household size was 2.18.  There were 750 families (54.0% of households); the average family size was 2.86.

The age distribution was 526 people (17.3%) under the age of 18, 196 people (6.5%) aged 18 to 24, 518 people (17.1%) aged 25 to 44, 1,150 people (37.9%) aged 45 to 64, and 642 people (21.2%) who were 65 or older.  The median age was 50.3 years. For every 100 females, there were 109.1 males.  For every 100 females age 18 and over, there were 107.8 males.

There were 2,198 housing units at an average density of 64.9 per square mile, of the occupied units 1,036 (74.6%) were owner-occupied and 353 (25.4%) were rented. The homeowner vacancy rate was 5.6%; the rental vacancy rate was 5.1%.  2,152 people (71.0% of the population) lived in owner-occupied housing units and 880 people (29.0%) lived in rental housing units.

According to the 2010 United States Census, Homestead Valley had a median household income of $31,881, with 18.7% of the population living below the federal poverty line.

References

Census-designated places in San Bernardino County, California
Census-designated places in California